Fredrik Lars-Owe Letzler (born 17 February 1972 in Västerhaninge, Stockholm) is a former Swedish freestyle swimmer. He competed twice at the Summer Olympics for his native country, in 1992 and 1996, both in the men's 4×100 m freestyle relay.

Clubs 
 Spårvägens SF

References 
 

1972 births
Living people
Swimmers at the 1992 Summer Olympics
Swimmers at the 1996 Summer Olympics
Olympic swimmers of Sweden
Swedish male freestyle swimmers
Medalists at the FINA World Swimming Championships (25 m)
European Aquatics Championships medalists in swimming